Nóra Barta (born 2 April 1984 in Budapest) is a Hungarian diver. She won the bronze medal in 3m Springboard event at the 2006 European Aquatics Championships and the silver in 1 m springboard event at the 2008 European Championships in Aquatics.

Barta has competed in four Olympic Summer Games, 2000, 2004, 2008 and 2012. She reached the final and her best result on the 3 m springboard in 2008. She lives and trains in Eindhoven, The Netherlands.

External links 
 Official website 

1984 births
Living people
Divers from Budapest
Hungarian female divers
Olympic divers of Hungary
Divers at the 2000 Summer Olympics
Divers at the 2004 Summer Olympics
Divers at the 2008 Summer Olympics
Divers at the 2012 Summer Olympics
Sportspeople from Budapest